Merulinidae is a family of reef-building stony corals.

Characteristics
All the genera in this family are colonial, reef-building corals. Skeletal structures are similar to those of Faviidae but are highly fused, without paliform lobes. The valleys are superficial or may be indistinct because of fan-like spreading or contortions in the ridges. Faviidae and Trachyphylliidae are the most closely related families.

Genera

The World Register of Marine Species includes these genera in the family:
Astrea Lamarck, 1801
Australogyra Veron & Pichon, 1982
Boninastrea Yabe & Sugiyama, 1935
Caulastraea Dana, 1846
Coelastrea Verrill, 1866
Cyphastrea Milne Edwards & Haime, 1848
Dipsastraea Blainville, 1830
Echinopora Lamarck, 1816
Erythrastrea Pichon, Scheer & Pillai, 1983
Favites Link, 1807
Goniastrea Milne Edwards & Haime, 1848
Hydnophora Fischer von Waldheim, 1807
Hydnophyllia † Reis, 1889 
Isastraea† Milne Edwards & Haime, 1851 
Leptoria Milne Edwards & Haime, 1848
Merulina Ehrenberg, 1834
Mycedium Milne Edwards & Haime, 1851
Orbicella Dana, 1846
Oulophyllia Milne Edwards & Haime, 1848
Paragoniastrea Huang, Benzoni & Budd, 2014
Paraleptoria† Budd & Bosellini, 2016 
Paramontastraea Huang & Budd, 2014
Pectinia Blainville, 1825
Physophyllia Duncan, 1884
Platygyra Ehrenberg, 1834
Scapophyllia Milne Edwards & Haime, 1848
Trachyphyllia Milne Edwards & Haime, 1849

References

 
Scleractinia
Cnidarian families
Taxa named by Addison Emery Verrill